Aluchin is a volcano along the Aluchin River in the Chukotka Autonomous Okrug of Russia. The volcano was discovered in 1956–1957 by G.K. Kleshchev.

Description
The volcano is formed by three cones, named Alpha, Beta and Gamma, which occur along a fissure. Alpha, the main cone, formed within a river valley. Beta, a smaller cone formed by lava and scoria, grew on the southeastern side of Alpha. It ejected lava bombs with sizes of up to  that landed in the surrounding valleys. Gamma is formed by agglomerates. Because the poorly indurated agglomerates are subject to rapid erosion the cone's structure has been heavily degraded.

Volcanic activity has generated lava flows that fill a valley. Part of the lava flowed down into the valley of the Aluchin River, reaching a length of  upvalley. These lava flows may be dependent on fissure eruptions along the fault rather than the cones. The eruption of the lava disrupted the river courses of the Aluchin and Burgakhchan rivers. Later the Aluchin River cut a deep gorge in the lava flow, exposing columnar basalts. The eruptions of the Beta and Gamma lava flows apparently occurred in three distinct events.

Volcanic rocks erupted by the Aluchin volcanic cones include basalts with glass-, pumice- and scoria-like consistency. Granodiorite blocks are found as xenoliths. The lava flows contain olivine, ilmenite and magnetite. The rocks of the volcano are of trachybasalt-basalt composition, being a typical continental Asia alkaline series. Their formation was influenced by pyroxene fractionation.

The volcano is located in part of the Anyuy area where a fault dating back possibly to the Paleozoic cuts the terrain. Paleozoic and possibly Proterozoic rocks crop out at the sides of the fault. A number of volcanic rocks, both effusive and intrusive ones, are associated with the fault and go as far back as the Devonian.

The lava flows of the Beta and Gamma cones apparently formed first. An age of 1000 CE was estimated for the volcanoes, on the basis of the timespan estimated for the development of soil on the lava flows and the growth of trees on them. This would make Aluchin one of the few continental Asian volcanoes with activity during the Holocene. Argon-argon dating however has yielded a much older age of 277,300 ± 2,100 years ago; that age may reflect a more general volcanic event in northeastern Russia, as other local volcanoes were also active at that time. The formation of the Alpha cone was characterized by an alternation of explosive and effusive  activity.

The Anyuy volcano lies  farther north. It and Aluchin form the Anyuy group of volcanoes which have erupted volcanic rocks with similar composition; their activity is associated with former and present-day plate boundaries in northeastern Russia.

See also
 Aluchin Horst
 List of volcanoes in Russia

References

Sources 

 
 
 

Volcanoes of Russia
Mountains of Chukotka Autonomous Okrug
Holocene volcanoes
Holocene Asia
Geology of the Russian Far East